The 2011 Kettering Borough Council election took place on 5 May 2011 to elect members of Kettering Borough Council in England. It was held on the same day as other local elections. The Conservative Party retained control of the council, which it had held since 2003.

Results

All Saints Ward (2 seats)

Avondale Grange Ward (2 seats)

Barton Ward (2 seats)

Brambleside Ward (2 seats)

Burton Latimer Ward (3 seats)

Desborough Loatland Ward (2 seats)

Desborough St Giles Ward (2 seats)

Ise Lodge (3 seats)

Northfield Ward (1 seat)

Piper's Hill Ward (2 seats)

Queen Eleanor & Buccleuch Ward (1 seat)

Rothwell (3 seats)

Slade Ward (2 seats)

St Michaels & Wicksteed  Ward (3 seats)

St Peters Ward (2 seats)

Welland Ward (1 seat)

William Knibb Ward (2 seats)

References

2011 English local elections
May 2011 events in the United Kingdom
2011
2010s in Northamptonshire